The Uruguay national badminton team represents Uruguay in international badminton team competitions. It is controlled by Associacion Uruguaya de Badminton. While badminton is not a popular sport in Uruguay, it has been gaining popularity after the country entered the Shuttle Time program organized by the Badminton World Federation. 

The national team made their first ever team event debut in 1985 at the South American Badminton Championships and finished in third place for a guaranteed bronze medal.

Participation in South American Badminton Championships 
Uruguay first competed in the South American Badminton Championships in 1985. Uruguay later qualified for a second time in 1988 when it hosted the championships. The last time the team ever competed in the championships was in 1996.

Mixed team

Current squad 
A new generation of badminton players have been selected to represent Uruguay in international competitions.

Men     
Santiago Tucuna
Santiago Brun
Marcos Carrasco

Women
Karina Sosa
Yamila Barreto
Lara Guillén

Coach Luis Pintos

References 

Badminton
National badminton teams